The Carroll News is a weekly newspaper based in Hillsville, Virginia and owned by Adams Publishing Group. It covers Carroll County, Virginia.

The News was previously owned by Heartland Publications. In 2012 Versa Capital Management merged Heartland Publications, Ohio Community Media, the former Freedom papers it had acquired, and Impressions Media into a new company, Civitas Media. Civitas Media sold the News and its properties in the Carolinas to Champion Media in 2017. Later in 2017, Champion Media sold the News to Adams Publishing Group.

References

Newspapers published in Virginia